Jamgaon is a village in Parner taluka in Ahmednagar district of state of Maharashtra, India.
This village comes into Moderate income zone and rain shadow area but It is well known for diploma in education college, i.e.(D.ed). This village has a fort of great administrator and one of the chief of Army of Peshwa, Mahadaji Shinde, who got this area as a gift for there bravery called as a 'Jagir'. The fort is gifted to Rayat Shikshan Sanstha by Mahadji shinde's decedent. The main source of income for people is farming but still there are some intellectual families are there like Bora, Pol, Shinde, Navale, Khade and Pawar etc. There are many villagers bearing surname Shinde, this surname came from the maratha clan. Muslims also live together. Jamgaon is very famous for the temples, 'Rameshwar' and 'Malganga' are the main God and Goddesses of the village. All Hindu as well as Muslim and Christian festivals celebrate together.

Religion
The majority of the population in the village is Hindu.

Economy
The majority of the population has agriculture as their primary occupation.

See also

 Parner taluka
 Villages in Parner taluka

References 

Villages in Parner taluka
Villages in Ahmednagar district